Perirhoe is a genus of sea snails, marine gastropod mollusks in the family Terebridae, the auger snails.

Species
Species within the genus Perirhoe include:
 Perirhoe circumcincta (Deshayes, 1857)
 Perirhoe valentinae (Aubry, 1999)
Species brought into synonymy
 Subgenus Perirhoe (Dimidacus) Iredale, 1929: synonym of Terebra Bruguière, 1789
 Perirhoe cerithina (Lamarck, 1822): synonym of Oxymeris cerithina (Lamarck, 1822)
 Perirhoe eburnea (Hinds, 1844): synonym of Myurella eburnea (Hinds, 1844)
 Perirhoe exulta Iredale, 1931: synonym of Terebra punctatostriata Gray, 1834
 Perirhoe melamans Iredale, 1929: synonym of Terebra cingulifera Lamarck, 1822

References

 Terryn Y. (2007). Terebridae: A Collectors Guide. Conchbooks & NaturalArt. 59pp + plates.

External links
  Dall W.H. (1908). Subdivisions of the Terebridae. The Nautilus. 21(11): 124-125

Terebridae
Gastropod genera